The 2015 Challenger La Manche was a professional tennis tournament played on indoor hard courts. It was the 22nd edition of the tournament which was part of the 2015 ATP Challenger Tour. It took place in Cherbourg, France between 23 February and 1 March.

Singles main-draw entrants

Seeds

 Rankings are as of 16 February 2015.

Other entrants
The following players received wildcards into the singles main draw:
  Enzo Couacaud
  Jonathan Eysseric
  Benoît Paire
  Alexandre Sidorenko

The following player received special exempt into the singles main draw:
  Mirza Bašić

The following player received entry as an alternate:
  Liam Broady

The following players received entry from the qualifying draw:
  Sergey Betov
  Daniel Brands
  Federico Gaio
  Maxime Teixeira

Champions

Singles

  Norbert Gombos def.  Benoît Paire, 6–1, 7–6(7–4)

Doubles

  Andreas Beck /  Jan Mertl def.  Rameez Junaid /  Adil Shamasdin, 6–2, 3–6, [10–3]

External links
Official Website
 Combined Main Draw

Challenger La Manche
Challenger La Manche
2015 in French tennis
February 2015 sports events in France
March 2015 sports events in France